Christine Wilson may refer to:
 Christine Wilson (priest), British Church of England priest
 Christine S. Wilson, American attorney on the Federal Trade Commission
 Christine Wilson (scientist), Canadian-American physicist and astronomer

See also
 Christina Wilson, American chef and reality television personality
 Christine Spittel-Wilson, British writer and artist